Los Gatos High School (LGHS) is a high school in Los Gatos, California. It was founded in 1908 and is part of the Los Gatos-Saratoga Joint Union High School District, which in 2021 was ranked the best high school district in California

The school enrolls approximately 2,100 students and employs about 100 teachers.  Los Gatos High School is accredited by the Western Association of Schools and Colleges (WASC) and has regularly received six-year accreditations, the highest possible. It has been recognized twice as a National School for Excellence. LGHS is also notable for its sports programs, most recently winning a Central Coast Section football title in 2019. The Los Gatos Wildcats are part of the Santa Clara Valley Athletic League of the CIF Central Coast Section.

History
Los Gatos High School, originally Los Gatos Union High School, was founded in 1908 and remains the only high school in Los Gatos. From the late 1880s until then, high school age students were taught at Los Gatos Central School, a grammar school which was established in 1886. The original building was in Mission Revival style, and on the site of the current library. The current Neoclassical main building was dedicated on January 17, 1925; it was built using a $250,000 bond measure passed in 1923, and was designed by W. H. Weeks, a famous architect of schools in California. The former building continued in use but was gradually demolished and by 1955 had entirely disappeared. The main building was extensively renovated in the mid-1960s, reopening in 1967. In 2001, the town of Los Gatos passed a $79 million bond measure for a new renovation, which included several new buildings.

Due to the unusual joint cooperative nature of the Los Gatos-Saratoga Joint Union High School District, until 2005, Saratoga High School shared Los Gatos High School's Prentiss Brown Auditorium for performing arts and, until 2006, they shared Helm Field for football games. Both are on the grounds of Los Gatos High School but are available for equal use by both schools. When the two schools played each other, the title of home team rotated between them each year.

Academics and Activities 
Los Gatos High School is well known for its rigorous academics. In 2021, Niche ranked Los Gatos High School as #37 with California. In 2021, 96% of graduating seniors went on to attend college, including 74% to four-year colleges, and had an average SAT score of 1326 and average ACT composite score of 29.8. During 2019–2020, 73% (387 students) of LGHS class of 2021 took at least one AP course.

Students participate in over 70 academic, athletic and community service activities that annually raise over $100,000 for charities and non-profit organizations.

Notable alumni

Notable alumni at Los Gatos High School include:
 Jared Allen, former NFL defensive end
 Kiko Alonso, former NFL linebacker

 Nick Bawden, NFL fullback
 , concept designer, appeared on 8 episodes of Motor City Masters
 Mark Bingham and Todd Beamer, passengers of United Airlines Flight 93 on 9/11 believed to have stormed cockpit after hijacking
 Lynn Burke, swimmer, winner of two gold medals in at the 1960 Summer Olympics in Rome, Italy
 Kari Byron, best known for her appearances on Discovery Channel show MythBusters
 Hugh Campbell, former head coach of NFL Houston Oilers, Canadian Football League Edmonton Eskimos, winner of 5 Grey Cup championships.
 Robert Chambers (1944), track & field, second-fastest all-time high school 880 as of that date; 3rd NCAA 880 for USC 1948; 6th 1948 London Olympics 800 meters
 Hal Chase, MLB player (New York Highlanders, New York Yankees, Chicago White Sox, Cincinnati Reds, New York Giants)
 Jordan Corey, singer/songwriter
 Michael Eugene Couchee, Major League Baseball player
 Trent Edwards, former NFL quarterback, 2007–2014
 Bill Fairband, former NFL linebacker
 Joan Fontaine, Academy Award-winning actress, estranged sister of Olivia de Havilland
 Scott Frank, screenwriter, wrote screenplays to Get Shorty and Minority Report
 Susan M. Gaines, novelist known for climate fiction and science in fiction. Author of the novels Accidentals and Carbon Dreams, and of the science book Echoes of Life: What Fossil Molecules Reveal about Earth History
 Olivia de Havilland, two-time Academy Award-winning actress who played Melanie Hamilton in Gone with the Wind
 Sandy Hill, mountaineer who successfully climbed the Seven Summits and author. 
 Jeffrey Hornaday, choreographer and director. Choreographed Flashdance and Madonna world tours
 Dan Jinks, producer of American Beauty, Big Fish and Down with Love
 Jason Jurman (Class of 1998), actor (Cougar Club)
 Lynette Knackstedt (Class of 1988), ska musician
 Chris Knapp, drummer for The Ataris
 Audrey Long, film actress
 Fred Markham, Olympic bicycle racer
 Ryan Nyquist, professional BMX rider
 Mike Park, musician and owner of Asian Man Records
 Greg Peters, former NFL offensive guard
 Logan Schafer, MLB player (Milwaukee Brewers)
 Shane Smith, former NFL fullback
 Jackson Stewart, professional bicycle racer
 Terry Scott Taylor, lead singer and songwriter for Daniel Amos, The Swirling Eddies; founding member of Lost Dogs
 Christine von Saltza, swimmer, winner of three gold medals and one silver medal at the 1960 Summer Olympics in Rome, Italy
 Carrie Yazel, Playboy Playmate of the Month, May 1991
 Members of bands Dredg, Trapt and Skankin' Pickle

In the media

The front façade of the school was shown on The Amanda Show starring Amanda Bynes. It was used in the show's soap opera spoof segment called "Moody's Point". The front exterior of the school was also used on Saved by the Bell.

The school was also used as a filming location for several scenes in the 1996 made-for-TV movie Lying Eyes.

The school, its stadium and track, and nearby Santa Cruz Avenue were also used for filming an episode of the 1986 television series Starman; drama students played the role of some extras.

The 1988 made-for-TV film Quiet Victory: The Charlie Wedemeyer Story was based on the life of former Los Gatos High School head football coach Charlie Wedemeyer, who was stricken with Amyotrophic lateral sclerosis and continued to coach the football team for several years. The movie was actually filmed in Goose Creek, South Carolina, at Stratford High School.

In 1992, Principal Ted Simonson, former Dean of Boys during earlier decades, attracted media controversy for a series of racist and bigoted jokes he made during a roast at the Lions Club in which he referred to female joggers as "jigglers" and described gay-friendly city of San Francisco as "Fairyland" and the city of Oakland, California, with its large African-American population, as "Jungleland."

In 2021, NBC Bay Area published an investigative report about "a wave of sexual misconduct allegations by current and former Los Gatos High School students on social media". The report details an ongoing student-led movement to change the culture of LGHS that gained momentum in 2020.

Principals
 Henry Meade Bland (1887–1889) – later California Poet Laureate
 C. H. Crowell (1889–1891)
 H. E. Shumate (1891–1895)
 A. M. Kelley (1895–1898)
 Louis K. Webb (1898–1899)
 George C. Russell (1899–1901)
 W. W. Wilson (1901–1905)
 Charles I. Kerr (1905–1908)
 Allan B. Martin (1908–1909)
 Frank M. Watson (1909–1915)
 Edwin Forrest Blayney (1915)
 W. F. Walton (1916–1918)
 E. N. Mabrey (1918–1920)
 Irving Wallace Snow (1920–1922)
 J. Warren Ayer (1922–1931)
 Prentiss Brown (1931–1956)
 Fred Canrinus (1957–1970) – older principals
 Dr Allen Coryell (1971–1978)
 Ted Simonson (1978–1998)
 Trudy McCullough (1998–2005)
 Doug Ramezane (2005–2009)
 Markus Autrey (2009–2015)
 Kristi Grasty (2015–2020)
 Paul Robinson (2020–2021, interim)
 Kevin Buchanan (from 2021)

References

External links 
 
 

Educational institutions established in 1908
High schools in Santa Clara County, California
Los Gatos, California
W. H. Weeks buildings
Public high schools in California
1908 establishments in California